Oued M'Zi is a town and commune in Laghouat Province, Algeria. According to the 1998 census it has a population of 1,786.

References

Communes of Laghouat Province